Antony Von Williams, known professionally as the World Famous Tony Williams, is an American singer and songwriter from Oklahoma City. Williams is perhaps best known for his vocals on his first cousin Kanye West's debut album, The College Dropout (2004) as well as his subsequent albums. He is currently managed by David Bullock.

Early life
Williams grew up an only child in Oklahoma City, Oklahoma. Both his mother and father had musical backgrounds, and Williams was given his first instrument, a saxophone, at the age of eight. He grew up singing in youth choirs at church and played in the marching band through his tenth grade year of high school. Williams love for music continued throughout his early adulthood as he went on to form several bands that ranged in style from funk, rock, alternative, and Christian alternative, and took on the role as lead vocalist.

Musical career

Songwriter
Williams' name appears on Kanye West's albums as Tony "Penafire" Williams which is the pseudonym he uses when crediting himself as a writer. He was a co-writer of two songs on The College Dropout, the Grammy Award winning 2004 album, following which Williams was invited to write for all of West's subsequent albums.

On the 2005 MTV documentary, Composing History The Making of Late Registration, he was featured producing vocals for Brandy on the song "Bring Me Down", which he co-wrote. During that documentary, West described Williams as being "a great writer with a cutting edge voice."

Singer

Tony Williams first became noticed as a singer when he debuted on Kanye West's Grammy winning album The College Dropout, singing a version of the gospel hymn "I'll Fly Away". By the second album, Late Registration, Kanye was giving Williams shout outs on the song, "We Major" which gave rise to the line Kanye fans use in reference to Williams, "I gotta say what's up to Tony Williams". On that same album Tony wrote the hook for the song, "Roses", which featured him singing with Patti LaBelle. This album not only promoted Tony Williams name, but for the first time fans were able to match his voice and name with a face. He was featured on the song and the video for "Drive Slow".  Later, he was seen singing with Kanye when West was featured on the MTV television series, Life and Rhymes of Kanye West.

By the time Kanye went on the Touch the Sky Tour, Williams was known as the background singer that always accompanied West, including on several world tours.

Williams is one of a few performers who have performed at two different Inaugural Balls; the Neighborhood Ball where he performed with Jay-Z on the song, History, and the Youth Ball where he performed with Kanye West. His voice is recognized on some popular Hip Hop songs, having performed with, for example, Jay-Z, Kanye West, Nas, Game, and Rick Ross.

In March 2010, Williams released his first mainstream project in the form of a mixtape, The World Famous Tony Williams: Finding Dakota Grey which was released with the GOOD Music stamp. This project was a collection of original music, covers, and remixes, including the "Dreaming of your love remix" with the French rapper Matt Moerdock.

In October 2010, Williams released his first single "Everything About You" from his debut studio album, King or the Fool, which was released on February 14, 2012.

Featured artist
The first time Williams experienced artistic autonomy was in 2007 when he made an appearance on Kanye's Can't Tell Me Nothing mixtape, singing a song he had written and that was produced by Kanye, "Dreaming of Your Love". This legitimized him as a featured artist. It was at that time that Williams added "The World Famous" to his name to differentiate himself from the famous drummer with the same name, and because in the vocal sample of the song "Dreaming of Your Love" the intro says, "You're listening to the world famous". Williams has had songs played on Brazilian airwaves, where he sang some of the vocals in Portuguese, and some musical chart success in France.

Discography

Studio albums

EPs

Mixtapes

Singles

As lead artist

Other charted songs

Album credits

References

External links 
 
 
 
 

Kanye West
Year of birth missing (living people)
Living people
Singer-songwriters from Oklahoma
Musicians from Oklahoma City
American soul singers
American hip hop singers
American rhythm and blues singer-songwriters
African-American male  singer-songwriters
Record producers from Oklahoma
American rhythm and blues musicians
Grammy Award winners
Date of birth missing (living people)
Place of birth missing (living people)
21st-century African-American male singers